Copelatus minor is a species of diving beetle. It is part of the genus Copelatus, which is in the subfamily Copelatinae of the family Dytiscidae. It was described by Bilardo & Pederzani in 1978.

References

minor
Beetles described in 1978